Bistolida hirundo is a species of sea snail, a cowry, a marine gastropod mollusc in the family Cypraeidae, the cowries.

Subspecies
Bistolida hirundo francisca (Schilder & Schilder, 1938)
Bistolida hirundo neglecta (Sowerby, 1837) (species inquirenda)
Bistolida hirundo rouxi (Ancey, 1882) (species inquirenda)

Distribution
This species occurs in the Red Sea and in the Indian Ocean off Aldabra, Chagos, Kenya, Madagascar, Mauritius, Réunion, the Seychelles, Somalia and Tanzania.

References

 Verdcourt, B. (1954). The cowries of the East African Coast (Kenya, Tanganyika, Zanzibar and Pemba). Journal of the East Africa Natural History Society 22(4) 96: 129–144, 17 pls.
 Orr J. (1985). Hong Kong seashells. The Urban Council, Hong Kong

External links
 Linnaeus, C. (1758). Systema Naturae per regna tria naturae, secundum classes, ordines, genera, species, cum characteribus, differentiis, synonymis, locis. Editio decima, reformata [10th revised edition, vol. 1: 824 pp. Laurentius Salvius: Holmiae]
 Iredale, T. (1939). Australian Cowries: Part II. Australian Zoologist. 297-323, 3 pl
 Philippi, R. A. (1849). Centuria tertia testaceorum novorum. Zeitschrift für Malakozoologie. 5(10): 151-160 [March 1849; 5(11): 161-176 [March 1849]; 5(12): 186-192 [April 1849]; 6(2): 17-26 [May1849 ]

Cypraeidae
Gastropods described in 1758
Taxa named by Carl Linnaeus